Jacobulus is an extinct genus of prehistoric ray-finned fish that lived during the Early Triassic epoch in what is now northern Madagascar 252.3 to 251.3 million years ago. The type species is Jacobulus novus (monotypy). J. novus ecology was a grazer-detritivore. It belongs to the Parasemionotidae together with Albertonia, Candelarialepis, Icarealcyon, Lehmanotus, Parasemionotus, Qingshania, Stensioenotus, Suius, Thomasinotus, and Watsonulus.

See also

 Prehistoric fish
 List of prehistoric bony fish

References

Parasemionotiformes
Early Triassic fish
Prehistoric animals of Madagascar
Prehistoric ray-finned fish genera